Ta Krei is a khum (commune) of Kamrieng District in Battambang Province in north-western Cambodia.

Villages
Source:

 Damnak Sala
 Kampong Chamlang Leu
 Kampong Chamlang Kraom
 Kamprang
 Srah Tuek Thmei
 Samseb
 Srah Kampaok
 Ta Krei
 Tuol Til
 Phlov Pram Muoy

References

Communes of Battambang province
Kamrieng District